1805 was the 19th season of cricket in England since the foundation of Marylebone Cricket Club (MCC). Lord Frederick Beauclerk became the first batsman known to have scored two centuries in the same season.

Honours
 Most runs – Lord Frederick Beauclerk 468 (HS 129*)
 Most wickets – William Lambert 20

Events
 Lord Frederick Beauclerk became the first batsman known to have scored two first-class centuries in a season when he made 129* for Hampshire v All-England in July and 102 for All-England v Surrey in August.
 In what was the first definitely recorded Eton v Harrow match at Lord's Old Ground, the future poet Lord Byron played for Harrow.
 With the Napoleonic War continuing, loss of investment and manpower impacted cricket and only six important matches have been recorded from 1805:
 Monday, 24 June: All-England v Surrey @ Lord's Old Ground
 Monday, 1 to Wednesday, 3 July: All-England v Hampshire @ Lord's Old Ground
 Monday, 8 to Wednesday, 10 July: All-England v The Bs @ Lord's Old Ground
 Monday, 15 to Tuesday, 16 July: All-England v Hampshire @ Lord's Old Ground
 Monday, 5 to Wednesday, 7 August: All-England XII v Surrey XII @ Lord's Old Ground
 Tuesday, 13 to Wednesday, 14 August: All-England XII v Surrey XII @ Lord's Old Ground

Other matches
Aside from the six matches above which are generally regarded as having been important by reference to various substantial sources (including the ACS, Britcher and Haygarth), there were eight other matches first noted by Britcher and confirmed by Haygarth:
 22–25 July: Twenty-Three v Twelve at Lord's
 12 August: Richmond v Homerton at Richmond Green
 21 August: Richmond v Homerton at Richmond Green
 24 August: Rick & Uxbridge v St Albans at Lord Essex's Park
 29–30 August: Kent v Bexley at Dartford Heath
 16–17 September: England III v Surrey III at Lord's
 21 September: Waltham Abbey v Homerton at Waltham Marsh, Essex
 23 September: Kent v Bexley at Judge's Ground, Maidstone

Debutants
1805 debutants included:
 Windebank (Hampshire)

References

Bibliography
 
  
 

1805 in English cricket
English cricket seasons in the 19th century